Xystodesmidae is a family of millipedes. Its members often have very small distributional areas, with many species only known from a single locality. They are found across the northern hemisphere, with peak diversity in the Appalachian Mountains, where one-third of the 300 or so species occur. They are particularly abundant in deciduous broadleaf forests in the Mediterranean Basin, Africa, Asia, Central and North America, and Russia. Information on basic taxonomy is scant for this family; for example, it is estimated that the genus Nannaria contains over 200 species, but only 25 were described as of 2006. By 2022, 78 species in Nannaria have been described.

Xystodesmidae contains many colorful and distinctive species, including Apheloria virginiensis of the eastern U.S. and Harpaphe haydeniana of the western U.S. The Sierra luminous millipedes of the genus Motyxia exhibit the only known examples of bioluminescence in the Polydesmida. Species of Apheloria and Brachoria in the Appalachians exhibit Müllerian mimicry, in which unrelated species resemble one another where they co-occur.

This family also includes the cave-dwelling genus Devillea, notable for having more than the 20 segments (counting the collum as the first segment and the telson as the last) usually found the Polydesmida. For example, in the species D. tuberculata, adult females have 22 segments and adult males have 21, with a corresponding increase in the number of leg pairs (35 in adult females and 32 in adult males, excluding the gonopods). Some species in this genus also exhibit variation in segment number within the same sex, for example, in D. subterranea, adult males can have as few as 19 segments or as many as 23. The species D. doderoi has the maximum number of segments recorded in this family (29, including the telson).

The family Xystodesmidae was named by O. F. Cook in 1895, upon the description of Xystodesmus martensii, (previously Polydesmus martensii). Xytodesmidae is placed in the suborder Chelodesmidea within the order Polydesmida (the "flat-backed" or "keeled millipedes").  Xystodemids are characterized by a relatively broad and compact body shape and one or more spines on the second leg-segments (prefemoral spines) in most species.

Classification
The family is divided into three subfamilies: the Melaphinae with around 10 species, the Parafontariinae with a dozen species in a single genus, and the Xystodesminae, with many genera and species.

Subfamily Melaphinae
Macellolophini
Macellolophus
Melaphini
Melaphe
Ochridaphe

Subfamily Parafontariinae 
 Parafontaria

Subfamily Xystodesminae 

The subfamily Xystodesminae is subdivided into ten tribes, each ending in the suffix "-ini", although taxonomist Richard Hoffman stated in his 1999 checklist: "I am by no means satisfied that this is the definitive arrangement, nor that the tribal divisions of the Xystodesminae are entirely satisfactory either."

Apheloriini Hoffman, 1980
 Apheloria
 Appalachioria
 Brachoria
 Brevigonus
 Cheiropus
 Cleptoria
 Croatania
 Deltotaria
 Dixioria
 Dynoria
 Falloria
 Furcillaria
 Lyrranea
 Prionogonus
 Rudiloria
 Sigmoria
 Stelgipus

Chonaphini Verhoeff, 1941
 Chonaphe
 Metaxycheir
 Montaphe
 Selenocheir
 Semionellus
 Tubaphe

Devilleini Brölemann, 1916
Devillea

Nannarini Hoffman, 1964
 Nannaria
 Oenomaea

Orophini Hoffman, 1964
Kiulinga
Pamelaphe
 Orophe

Pachydesmini Hoffman, 1980
 Dicellarius
 Pachydesmus
 Thrinaxoria

Rhysodesmini Brolemann, 1916
 Boraria
 Cherokia
 Erdelyia
 Gyalostethus
 Pleuroloma
 Rhysodesmus
 Stenodesmus
 Caralinda
 Gonoessa
 Lourdesia
 Parvulodesmus

Sigmocheirini Causey, 1955
 Ochthocelata
 Sigmocheir

Xystocheirini Cook, 1904
 Anombrocheir
 Motyxia
 Parcipromus
 Wamokia
 Xystocheir

Xystodesmini Hoffman, 1980
 Harpaphe
 Isaphe
 Koreoaria
 Levizonus
 Riukiaria
 Thrinaphe
 Xystodesmus
 Yaetakaria

See also

 List of Xystodesmidae genera

References

External links

Polydesmida
Millipede families